NGC 1969 (also known as ESO 56-SC124) is an open star cluster in the Dorado constellation and is part of the Large Magellanic Cloud. It was discovered by James Dunlop on September 24, 1826. Its apparent size is 0.8 arc minutes.

See also 
 List of NGC objects (1001–2000)

References

External links 
 

Dorado (constellation)
ESO objects
1969
Open clusters
Large Magellanic Cloud
Astronomical objects discovered in 1826
Discoveries by James Dunlop